A literature review is an overview of the previously published works on a topic. The term can refer to a full scholarly paper or a section of a scholarly work such as a book, or an article. Either way, a literature review is supposed to provide the researcher/author and the audiences with a general image of the existing knowledge on the topic under question. A good literature review can ensure that a proper research question has been asked and a proper theoretical framework and/or research methodology have been chosen. To be precise, a literature review serves to situate the current study within the body of the relevant literature and to provide context for the reader. In such case, the review usually precedes the methodology and results sections of the work.

Producing a literature review is often a part of graduate and post-graduate student work, including in the preparation of a thesis, dissertation, or a journal article. Literature reviews are also common in a research proposal or prospectus (the document that is approved before a student formally begins a dissertation or thesis).

A literature review can be a type of review article.  In this sense, a literature review is a scholarly paper that presents the current knowledge including substantive findings as well as theoretical and methodological contributions to a particular topic. Literature reviews are secondary sources and do not report new or original experimental work.  Most often associated with academic-oriented literature, such reviews are found in academic journals and are not to be confused with book reviews, which may also appear in the same publication. Literature reviews are a basis for research in nearly every academic field.

Types
The main types of literature reviews are: evaluative, exploratory, and instrumental.

A fourth type, the systematic review, is often classified separately, but is essentially a literature review focused on a research question, trying to identify, appraise, select and synthesize all high-quality research evidence and arguments relevant to that question. A meta-analysis is typically a systematic review using statistical methods to effectively combine the data used on all selected studies to produce a more reliable result.

Torraco (2016) describes an integrative literature review. The purpose of an integrative literature review is to generate new knowledge on a topic through the process of review, critique, and then synthesis of the literature under investigation.

Process and product
Shields and Rangarajan (2013) distinguish between the process of reviewing the literature and a finished work or product known as a literature review. The process of reviewing the literature is often ongoing and informs many aspects of the empirical research project.

The process of reviewing the literature requires different kinds of activities and ways of thinking. Shields and Rangarajan (2013) and Granello (2001) link the activities of doing a literature review with Benjamin Bloom’s revised taxonomy of the cognitive domain (ways of thinking: remembering, understanding, applying, analyzing, evaluating, and creating).

See also 

Empirical study of literature
Living review
Media monitoring
Review journal

References

Further reading 

 
 
 
 
 
 
 

Academic publishing
Research methods
Information science